M. bidentata may refer to:

 Manilkara bidentata, a large tree
 Micrurapteryx bidentata, a Kyrgyzstani moth
 Mysella bidentata, a saltwater clam